Smethwick Rolfe Street is one of two railway stations serving the town of Smethwick, West Midlands, England. It is situated on the Rugby-Birmingham-Stafford Line 3¼ miles (5 km) north west of Birmingham New Street. The station, and all trains serving it, are operated by West Midlands Railway.

History
The station was opened in July 1852 by the Birmingham, Wolverhampton, & Stour Valley Railway Company (later absorbed by London and North Western Railway) as part of the Stour Valley Line from Birmingham to Wolverhampton. It was rebuilt in its present form in 1890 when two level crossings in the centre of Smethwick were abolished. Drawings of the rebuilt station can be found on the Smethwick Rolfe Street Station gallery page of the Network Rail Corporate Archive.

In 1985, pupils from Parkside Junior School created a mural for Platform 1 under the direction of artist Jeremy Waygood as part of the Birmingham to Wolverhampton Corridor Initiative.

In June 2017, this mural was removed and replaced by one created by students from Sandwell College under the direction of artist Steve Field. In addition, an exhibition room was created by another set of students from the college to display the history of the station and of the murals. In October 2017 this work was recognised in the ACoRP Community Rail Awards with a 1st place for Involving Diverse Groups and a 3rd place for Community Art Schemes - Permanent.

Work began in January 2022 to install lifts to allow step-free access to the station. The project is expected to be completed by July.

Services
On Sundays, the service runs hourly between New Street and Wolverhampton only.

These are usually operated by a mixture of Class 323 and Class 350s EMUs but occasional Class 170 DMUs are used.

Avanti West Coast, CrossCountry, London Northwestern Railway and Transport for Wales Rail trains run through the station but do not stop. London Northwestern Railway does call at the nearby station of Smethwick Galton Bridge en route to Liverpool Lime Street.

References

External links

Rail Around Birmingham and the West Midlands: Smethwick Rolfe Street station

Railway stations in Sandwell
DfT Category E stations
Former London and North Western Railway stations
Railway stations in Great Britain opened in 1852
Railway stations served by West Midlands Trains
Smethwick
1852 establishments in England